DC Super Hero Girls is an American animated web series based on the DC Comics superhero media franchise.

Series overview

Episodes

Season 1 (2015–16)

Season 2 (2016–17)

Season 3 (2017)

Season 4 (2018)

Season 5 (2018)

References

External links
 
 

DC Super Hero Girls
Lists of web series episodes